Shelley is a city in Bingham County, Idaho. The population was 4,409 at the 2010 census. The mascot for the city's high school is a Russet Burbank potato that wears a crown, robe and scepter.

Since 1927 Shelley has been home to the "Idaho Annual Spud Day", which is celebrated on the 3rd Saturday of September. It typically features a parade, live bands, a Spud Tug, a spud-picking Contest, and free baked potatoes.

History

Shelley was established in 1904.  It was named for John F. Shelley, who moved to the area in 1892.  He'd moved to the area intending to open a small store, and needed lumber and other supplies to build it. Since the site was some distance from the nearest existing community, he asked the railroad company to make a special stop to offload the supplies he'd ordered.  They consented, provided he could offload the supplies in under 20 minutes. His daughter, Lottie, wrote the following in her personal history: 

On September 4, 1902 a large fire destroyed seven buildings on State Street. Only two buildings, a general merchandise store and Nalder's furniture store, were saved. Soren Yorgesen, a local Justice of the Peace and proprietor of the first hotel in Shelley recounts the experience as follows:

Geography
Shelley is located at  (43.379490, -112.123846).

Shelley is located on the eastern side of the Snake River, facing the Blackfoot Mountains.

Greenbelt
Beginning at the fire department, across the street from Shelley High School, lies the Shelley Greenbelt. This fully paved trail, a collaborative project between Shelley and Bingham County, follows the Snake River for 2 miles before terminating at North Bingham County Park. The trail includes picnic tables, benches, and activities for families throughout.

Idaho Annual Spud Day

In September, 1927, Shelley hosted its first Spud Day (Now called The Idaho Spud Day), now a yearly tradition usually taking place on the third Saturday each September. During this first Spud day, 10,000 people were served hot baked potatoes with butter. This tradition continues each year, along with several other events. These events have included a parade that features the various clubs and bands of the schools in the area, as well as local businesses and groups. Other events include the spud tug - where teams play a game of tug of war over a pit of mashed potatoes blended together in a cement truck, spud run - a set of 1-mile and 5k races, concerts, fairground booths and games, and a demolition derby hosted at nearby North Bingham County Park. This event is usually the beginning of Spud Harvest, a 2-week break from school to allow students to assist in the seasons potato harvest.

Demographics

2010 census
As of the census of 2010, there were 4,409 people, 1,445 households, and 1,123 families residing in the city. The racial makeup of the city was 89.0% White, 0.3% African American, 0.8% Native American, 0.7% Asian, 0.2% Pacific Islander, 7.0% from other races, and 2.1% from two or more races. Hispanic or Latino of any race were 14.0% of the population.

There were 1,445 households, of which 49.1% had children under the age of 18 living with them, 61.6% were married couples living together, 12.1% had a female householder with no husband present, 4.0% had a male householder with no wife present, and 22.3% were non-families. 19.6% of all households were made up of individuals, and 7.1% had someone living alone who was 65 years of age or older. The average household size was 3.05 and the average family size was 3.53.

The median age in the city was 27.8 years. 36.1% of residents were under the age of 18; 9.6% were between the ages of 18 and 24; 25.6% were from 25 to 44; 19.2% were from 45 to 64; and 9.5% were 65 years of age or older. The gender makeup of the city was 49.4% male and 50.6% female.

2000 census
As of the census of 2000, there were 3,813 people, 1,201 households, and 989 families residing in the city. The racial makeup of the city was 89.93% White, 0.18% African American, 0.68% Native American, 0.26% Asian, 0.03% Pacific Islander, 6.74% from other races, and 2.18% from two or more races. Hispanic or Latino of any race were 11.78% of the population.

There were 1,201 households, out of which 48.9% had children under the age of 18 living with them, 67.0% were married couples living together, 13.0% had a female householder with no husband present, and 17.6% were non-families. 15.3% of all households were made up of individuals, and 7.2% had someone living alone who was 65 years of age or older. The average household size was 3.14 and the average family size was 3.50.

In the city, the population was spread out, with 35.6% under the age of 18, 11.5% from 18 to 24, 25.5% from 25 to 44, 16.8% from 45 to 64, and 10.6% who were 65 years of age or older. The median age was 27 years. For every 100 females, there were 96.2 males. For every 100 females age 18 and over, there were 90.3 males.

The median income for a household in the city was $39,318, and the median income for a family was $41,223. Males had a median income of $32,154 versus $20,121 for females. The per capita income for the city was $13,921. About 7.9% of families and 9.6% of the population were below the poverty line, including 10.6% of those under age 18 and 2.0% of those age 65 or over.

Notable people
 Lavina Fielding Anderson, LDS scholar and author
Curt Brinkman, Paralympic athlete
Lewis Croft, actor
Brad Daw, member of the Utah House of Representatives
Hadley Foster, men's college volleyball coach
Ogden Kraut, religious author
Darwin Young, former member of the Idaho House of Representatives
Dan Dockstader, President Wyoming State Senate, two-time Wyoming state delegate to National Republican Convention (2012, 2016)
John L. Moore, former state senator, Idaho state delegate to 1932 National Democratic Convention.

References

External links
 City website

Cities in Bingham County, Idaho
Cities in Idaho